Seemanthaputhran is a 1976 Indian Malayalam film,  directed by A. B. Raj and produced by R. S. Sreenivasan. The film stars Prem Nazir, Jayabharathi, KPAC Lalitha and Adoor Bhasi in the lead roles. The film has musical score by M. K. Arjunan.

Cast

Prem Nazir
Jayabharathi
KPAC Lalitha
Adoor Bhasi
Jose Prakash
Sreelatha Namboothiri
Baby Padmini
G. K. Pillai
MG Soman

Soundtrack
The music was composed by M. K. Arjunan and the lyrics were written by Sreekumaran Thampi.

References

External links
 

1976 films
1970s Malayalam-language films
Films directed by A. B. Raj